George Joseph Young (April 1, 1890 – March 13, 1950) was a professional baseball player. He played two games in Major League Baseball for the Cleveland Naps in 1913, both as a pinch hitter. He played two seasons of minor league baseball for the Charleston Senators of the Ohio State League, where he was primarily a catcher.

Sources

Cleveland Naps players
Charleston Senators players
Baseball catchers
Baseball players from New York (state)
1890 births
1950 deaths
Burials at Long Island National Cemetery